Ronan James Dunne (born 31 October 1963) is an Irish telecommunications executive. In 2001, he joined British wireless carrier O2 becoming CEO from 2008 to 2016, until joining U.S. carrier Verizon Wireless as president that August.

Early life
He was born in Dublin. He attended Blackrock College in Blackrock, Dublin.

He moved to the UK in 1987.

Career
He had worked with Banque Nationale de Paris, now known as BNP Paribas, from 1987 and with Waste Management International in 1994, and NFC in 1996.

O2
He joined O2 in 2001 as deputy to the chief financial officer, becoming chief financial officer in February 2005. O2 was bought by Telefónica in November 2005 for £18bn. BT de-merged from Cellnet in November 2001.

He became chief executive of O2 in January 2008. Also in 2008, he was appointed chairman of Tesco Mobile, a joint venture between Telefónica and Tesco.

In July 2016, following O2's failed merger with Hutchison 3G, Dunne stepped down. His 15-year tenure made him the longest-serving CEO in the British telecom industry.

Verizon
In August 2016, Dunne was hired as the executive vice president and group president of U.S. carrier Verizon Wireless.  In 2021, he stepped down.

See also
 Guy Laurence, chief executive of Vodafone UK
 Olaf Swantee, chief executive of EE Limited

References

1963 births
Blackrock College RFC players
Irish accountants
Irish chief executives
O2 (UK)
Verizon Wireless
People educated at Blackrock College
Businesspeople from Dublin (city)
People from Weybridge
Living people